Cathedral Square Park  is a small urban Milwaukee County Park in Milwaukee, Wisconsin, US, located to the west of the Cathedral of St. John the Evangelist. The park only takes the name of the nearby cathedral, with the Archdiocese of Milwaukee holding no ownership of the site.

History
Originally known as Courthouse Square, the land was donated by city co-founder Solomon Juneau in 1836, and housed a court house and jail. The first courthouse was built by Solomon Juneau and Morgan L. Martin. A mob of 5,000 people converged at the jail in 1854 to rescue Joshua Glover, a runaway slave captured and imprisoned by federal marshals. During the American Civil War, parkland south of the courthouse was used as place to assemble for troops leaving for or returning from the front.

A second courthouse was built on the site in 1873, and was used until 1931 when the current Milwaukee County Courthouse was built. The jail was moved to another site in 1886.

Current park
The area became a park in 1939 after the second courthouse was razed. Since then, it has become a popular meeting place and host for events such as Jazz in the Park and the farmers' market, and as the site of the city's official Christmas tree. The city currently offers free Wi-Fi service in the park, while WISN-TV has a permanent weather observation camera overlooking the square as part of their local camera network. As of November 2nd, 2018, the Milwaukee Streetcar stops near the park.

See also
Immigrant Mother

References

Parks in Milwaukee, Wisconsin
Geography of Milwaukee
Tourist attractions in Milwaukee
Protected areas of Milwaukee County, Wisconsin
1939 establishments in Wisconsin